The discography of Eighteen Visions, an American metalcore band, consists of eight studio albums, three extended plays, seven singles and six music videos.

Albums

Studio albums

Extended plays

Singles

Other appearances

Music videos

References

Heavy metal group discographies
Discographies of American artists